Baszkówka  is a village in the administrative district of Gmina Piaseczno, within Piaseczno County, Masovian Voivodeship, in east-central Poland.

On August 25, 1994, the village witnessed the fall of a stony meteorite.

References

Villages in Piaseczno County